is a town located in Gunma Prefecture, Japan. , the town had an estimated population of  11154 in 4303 households, and a population density of 570 persons per km².

Geography
Meiwa is located in the northern Kantō Plains in the extreme southern corner Gunma prefecture, bordered by Saitama Prefecture to the south. The Tone River passes through the town. Located only  from metropolitan Tokyo, many of its residents commute to Tokyo for work or schooling.

Surrounding municipalities
Gunma Prefecture
 Tatebayashi
 Chiyoda
 Itakura
Saitama Prefecture
 Hanyū
 Gyōda

Climate
Meiwa has a Humid continental climate (Köppen Cfa) characterized by hot summers and cold winters.  The average annual temperature in Meiwa is 14.5 °C. The average annual rainfall is 1291 mm with September as the wettest month. The temperatures are highest on average in August, at around 26.7 °C, and lowest in January, at around 3.3 °C.

Demographics
Per Japanese census data, the population of Itakura peaked around the year 2000 and has declined slightly since.

History
The villages of Sanuki, Umeshima and Chieda were created within Ōra District, Gunma Prefecture on April 1, 1889 with the creation of the modern municipalities system after the Meiji Restoration. On March 1, 1955, the three villages merged to form the village of Meiwa. Meiwa was raised to town status on October 1, 1998.

Government
Meiwa has a mayor-council form of government with a directly elected mayor and a unicameral town council of 12 members. Meiwa, together with the other municipalities in Ōra District contributes three members to the Gunma Prefectural Assembly. In terms of national politics, the town is part of Gunma 3rd district of the lower house of the Diet of Japan.

Economy
Meiwa is largely a bedroom community for Tokyo and nearby Tatebayashi. Agricultural products include  Japanese Pear,  Kyoho Grapes,  Cyclamen,  Carnation and Peach.

Education
Meiwa has two public elementary schools and one public middle schools operated by the town government, and one public high school operated by the Gunma Prefectural Board of Education.

Transportation

Railway
 Tōbu Railway – Tobu Isesaki Line

Highway

References

External links

Official Website 

Towns in Gunma Prefecture
Meiwa, Gunma